Dennis Jennings may refer to:

 Dennis Jennings (footballer) (1910–1996), English footballer
 Dennis Jennings (Internet pioneer), Irish physicist, academic and Internet pioneer